The yellow-striped pygmy eleuth (Eleutherodactylus limbatus), also known as the yellow-striped dwarf frog, is a species of frog in the family Eleutherodactylidae from closed mesic and xeric forests in Cuba.

It is part of a closely related Cuban group that contains five additional described species (E. cubanus, E. etheridgei, E. iberia, E. jaumei and  E. orientalis) and at least one undescribed species; most of which are of tiny size, relatively brightly colored and possibly aposematic (at least E. iberia and E. orientalis have alkaloid toxins in their skin). Among these, the yellow-striped pygmy eleuth is unique in being quite widespread in Cuba, whereas the others all have very small ranges in the eastern part of the island.

Mating calls and reproduction
E. limbatus has a very intense mating call, but it is brief (6.9 to 24.8 milliseconds) and high-pitched (6.5 to 8.3 kHz), at a rate of 278 per minute. Female frogs have a single ovary and lay one egg at a time, which is subsequently buried in the ground, where it develops quickly.

Habitat
These frogs are found in Cuba at elevations up to 1,150 m above sea level, in closed-canopy mesic and xeric forests.  Their distribution is highly fragmented, with the total land area equaling 7,700 mi2 (20,000 km2). Within this limited area, though, they are quite numerous.

References

Further reading
http://www.globalamphibians.org/servlet/GAA?searchName=Eleutherodactylus+limbatus 

http://www.picsearch.com/info.cgi?q=%22Eleutherodactylus%20limbatus%22&id=muntYNdnS5FzF_IYhhwRWo9K6pdfkD-RKQeGjIB4TXQ
http://www.itis.gov/servlet/SingleRpt/SingleRpt?search_topic=TSN&search_value=550347
http://www.eleuthare.com/listae.html

Eleutherodactylus
Amphibians of Cuba
Endemic fauna of Cuba
Amphibians described in 1862
Taxa named by Edward Drinker Cope